Laurent-Benoît Dewez (14 April 1731 – 1 November 1812) was a Belgian architect of Walloon origin. He is considered the most influential architect in the Austrian Netherlands (present-day Belgium) from the second half of the 18th century. His architectural projects are of international stature and introduced a neoclassical style, with Italian and English influences, to the region.  He designed a large number of châteaux, abbeys and churches in Belgium, many of which were damaged after the French Revolution.

Early life
Dewez was born in Petit-Rechain near Verviers on 14 April 1731. The abbot of the Abbey of Saint Hubert sent him on a study trip to Italy. There he worked with Luigi Vanvitelli and came into contact with Robert Adam, Giovanni Battista Piranesi, Johann Joachim Winckelmann and Charles-Louis Clérisseau. After a subsequent study trip to Split in the company of Robert Adam he worked briefly as an associate of the Adam brothers in London in 1758. In 1759 he came back to the Austrian Netherlands to start the rebuilding of Abbaye Notre-Dame d'Orval, a work which was never completed.

Professional life
In 1760 he settled in Brussels. He mainly worked for abbeys and nobility in the Austrian Netherlands. In 1767 he was appointed court architect to the Governor of the Austrian Netherlands, Charles-Alexandre de Lorraine for whom he built the Castle of Mariemont which was demolished in the aftermath of the French Revolution. A masterpiece still preserved today is the Château de Seneffe built between 1763 and 1768. His last great project was the new State Prison in Vilvoorde. Dewez's adversaries, envious of his success as court architect, accused him of failures and fraud in the execution of this project. Due to these accusations, he fell into disfavour and was dismissed as court architect. On the invasion of the Austrian Netherlands by French revolutionary troops in 1793, Dewez fled to Prague. In the Czech capital, he designed and built some private mansions for the local bourgeoisie. In 1804 he returned to Belgium. He died relatively impoverished in Groot-Bijgaarden on 1 November 1812. His tombstone with a brief Latin description of his life and work, can still be seen in the exterior wall of the church of Groot-Bijgaarden.

Buildings designed

Abbey of Affligem (demolished)
Abbaye Notre-Dame d'Orval (demolished)
Abbey of Dielegem in Jette near Brussels (partly demolished)
Abbey of Forest
Vlierbeek Abbey
Abbey of Opheylissem today Hélécine
Abbey of Gembloux

Abbot's palace of the Abbey of Tournai, today Hôtel de Ville.
Abbey church of Bonne-Espérance.
Church of Harelbeke
Church of Andenne
Château de Wasseiges (demolished)
Château de Seneffe
Château de Mariemont (demolished)
State Prison of Vilvoorde

Gallery

References
 Kevin Brown, Artist and Patrons: Court Art and Revolution in Brussels at the end of the Ancien Regime, Dutch Crossing, Taylor and Francis (2017).
Léon Dewez, 'Laurent-Benoit Dewez: premier architecte de la Cour de Bruxelles sous Charles de Lorraine', 1731–1812, in: Annales de la Société royale d'archéologie de Bruxelles. - 35(1930); pp. 65–94.
Cathérine de Braekeleer, Laurent-Benoît Dewez 1731–1812, Seneffe, 1992.
H. Gerson and E. H. ter Kuile, Art and Architecture in Belgium, 1600–1800, Harmondsworth, England, 1960.

1731 births
1812 deaths
Architects of the Austrian Netherlands
People from Verviers